Gardenia brighamii, commonly known as nānū, nau, or forest gardenia, is a species of flowering plant in the coffee family, Rubiaceae, that is endemic to Hawaii.

Description
The petals of the solitary, white flowers are fused at the base to form a tube  in length and have six lobes.

Gallery

Habitat and range
It previously could be found on all main islands, but today populations only exist on Maui, Molokai, Oahu, and Lānai, and the Big Island.

Conservation
The total population of G. brighamii is between 15 and 19 trees.  There are only two plants in the wild on Oahu and one on the Big Island.  Major threats to the survival of this species include loss of dry forest habitat and the establishment of invasive species, such as fountain grass (Pennisetum setaceum).

Uses
Native Hawaiians made kua kuku (kapa anvils) and pou (house posts) from the wood of nānū.  A yellow kapa dye was derived from the fruit pulp. The white, fragrant flowers are used in lei. Today, it is grown as an ornamental plant on the islands.

References

External links

brighamii
Plants described in 1867
Endemic flora of Hawaii
Trees of Hawaii
Critically endangered flora of the United States
Taxonomy articles created by Polbot